Michael D. Helfrich House is a historic home located at Evansville, Indiana.  It was designed by the architectural firm Clifford Shopbell & Co. and built in 1920. It is a two-story, Prairie School style brown brick and limestone sheathed dwelling.  It features a complex arrangement of interlocking masses, art glass windows, corner piers, massive brick chimney, and a porte cochere.

It was added to the National Register of Historic Places in 1984.

References

Houses on the National Register of Historic Places in Indiana
Prairie School architecture in Indiana
Houses completed in 1920
Houses in Evansville, Indiana
National Register of Historic Places in Evansville, Indiana